Dame Carol Vivien Robinson,  (née Bradley; born 10 April 1956) is a British chemist and former President of the Royal Society of Chemistry (2018–2020). She was a Royal Society Research Professor and is the Dr Lee's Professor of Physical and Theoretical Chemistry, and a Professorial Fellow at Exeter College, University of Oxford. She is the first director of the Kavli Institution for Nanoscience Discovery, University of Oxford, and she was previously Professor of Mass Spectrometry at the Department of Chemistry of the University of Cambridge.

Early life and education
Born in Kent, the daughter of Denis E. Bradley and Lillian (née Holder), Carol Vivien Bradley left school at 16 and began her career as a lab technician in Sandwich, Kent with Pfizer, where she began working with the then novel technique of mass spectrometry.

Her potential was spotted, and she gained further qualifications at evening classes and day release from her job at Pfizer. After earning her degree, she left Pfizer and studied for a Master of Science degree at the University of Swansea, followed by a PhD at the University of Cambridge, which she completed in just two years, rather than the more usual three. During this time she was a student at Churchill College, Cambridge.

Career and research
After a postdoctoral training fellowship at the University of Bristol, Robinson took up a junior position in the mass spectrometry unit at the University of Oxford, where she began analysing protein folding. Robinson and colleagues successfully captured protein folding in the presence of the chaperone GroEL, demonstrating that at least some aspects of protein secondary structure could be studied in the gas phase.

Robinson has broken ground as the first female professor in the department of chemistry at both the University of Cambridge (2001) and the University of Oxford (2009). Her research has pushed the limits of electrospray ionization mass spectrometry, demonstrating that proteins and other complex macromolecules can be studied in the gas phase. In addition to her contributions to the study of protein folding, Robinson has conducted important work on ribosomes, molecular chaperones and most recently membrane proteins. Her research has made seminal contributions to gas-phase structural biology, with progress toward the study of protein complexes in their native environments for drug discovery. Additionally, she is Co-founder and director of OMass Therapeutics, a University of Oxford spin-out company applying mass spectrometry technology to drug discovery.

Honours and awards
Robinson was awarded the American Society for Mass Spectrometry's Biemann Medal in 2003, and the Christian B. Anfinsen Award in 2008. In 2004 the Royal Society awarded her both a Fellowship (FRS) and the Rosalind Franklin Award. Her nomination for the Royal Society reads:

In 2010 Robinson received the Davy Medal "for her ground-breaking and novel use of mass spectrometry for the characterisation of large protein complexes".

In 2011 she was given the Interdisciplinary Prize by the Royal Society of Chemistry for "development of a new area of research, gas-phase structural biology, using highly refined mass spectrometry techniques", the Aston Medal, and the FEBS/EMBO Women in Science Award.

She has been awarded honorary doctorates from the University of Kent, the University of York, and the University of Bristol.

She was appointed Dame Commander of the Order of the British Empire (DBE) in the 2013 New Year Honours for services to science and industry.

She received the Thomson Medal Award in 2014.

In 2015 she was a laureate of the L'Oréal-UNESCO For Women in Science Awards; "For her groundbreaking work in macromolecular mass spectrometry and pioneering gas phase structural biology by probing the structure and reactivity of single proteins and protein complexes, including membrane proteins." She was also made a Rhodes Trustee.

In 2017 she was elected a Foreign Associate of the US National Academy of Sciences.

In 2018 she won the Frank H. Field and Joe L. Franklin Award for Outstanding Achievement in Mass Spectrometry from the American Chemical Society.

In 2019 she won the Novozymes Prize for "almost single-handedly founding a subfield of mass spectrometry proteomics". Also in 2019 she received the Royal Medal.

In 2020, she was chosen as the recipient of the Othmer Gold Medal.

In 2021 she received the 2022 Louis-Jeantet Prize for Medicine.

In 2021 she was awarded with the 2022 European Chemistry Gold Medal by the European Chemical Society.

In 2021 she became an International Honorary Member of the American Academy of Arts and Sciences.

In 2022 she was awarded the Franklin Institute Award for Chemistry.

References

External links
  (See Denis Noble.)
 
 
 
  (interview conducted by Erick M. Carreira)

1956 births
Living people
British chemists
Dames Commander of the Order of the British Empire
Female Fellows of the Royal Society
Fellows of Churchill College, Cambridge
Fellows of the Royal Society
Place of birth missing (living people)
British women chemists
Academics of the University of Oxford
Fellows of Exeter College, Oxford
Alumni of Swansea University
Alumni of Churchill College, Cambridge
Fellows of the Academy of Medical Sciences (United Kingdom)
Dr Lee's Professors of Chemistry
Rhodes Trustees
L'Oréal-UNESCO Awards for Women in Science laureates
21st-century British women scientists
Foreign associates of the National Academy of Sciences
Presidents of the Royal Society of Chemistry
Thomson Medal recipients
Mass spectrometrists